The Assistant Secretary of the Air Force for Space Acquisition and Integration (ASAF(SA&I)) is a civilian position in the United States Department of the Air Force that is appointed by the president of the United States and confirmed by the United States Senate. This position is established under Title 10 US Code Section 9016. The assistant secretary reports to the Secretary of the Air Force.

Responsibilities

The assistant secretary of the Air Force for space acquisition and integration serves as the space service acquisition executive (SAE) and the senior procurement executive for space programs in the Department of the Air Force.

History

The position of the assistant secretary of the Air Force for space acquisition and integration was created in the National Defense Authorization Act for Fiscal Year 2020, signed on 20 December 2019, to oversee and direct the Space and Missile Systems Center, Space Rapid Capabilities Office, and Space Development Agency.

The position was directed to stand up as the Space Service Acquisition Executive (SAE) in 2022. Prior to this date, the position was responsible for advising the existing SAE for space programs, the ASAF for Acquisition, Technology, and Logistics ((ASAF (AT&L), encoded as SAF/AQ). The Office of the Assistant Secretary of the Air Force for Space Acquisition and Integration (SAF/SQ) was created by merging the Office of the Principal Assistant to the Secretary of the Air Force for Space (SAF/SP) with the Office of the Assistant Secretary of the Air Force for Acquisition, Technology, and Logistics (SAF/AQS).

List of assistant secretaries

List of military deputies to the assistant secretary

The military deputy to the Assistant Secretary of the Air Force for Space Acquisition and Integration was formerly the director of space programs at the Office of the Assistant Secretary of the Air Force for Acquisition, Technology, and Logistics (SAF/AQ). The officeholder is responsible for helping the assistant secretary oversee research and development, test, production, product support and modernization of Space Force programs.

The was renamed to the current title in August 2020 after Secretary of the Air Force Frank Kendall ordered the acceleration of separating space acquisition authority from SAF/AQ.

References

External links
 Air Force Space Acquisition and Integration - Air Force Space Acquisition and Integration

 
United States Air Force